Jamie Coman (born 20 April 1962) is an Australian former equestrian. He competed in two events at the 2000 Summer Olympics.

References

External links
 

1962 births
Living people
Australian male equestrians
Olympic equestrians of Australia
Equestrians at the 2000 Summer Olympics
People from the South Coast (New South Wales)
Sportsmen from New South Wales
20th-century Australian people